Kostis Papagiorgis (real name: Κωνσταντίνος Παπαγεωργίου Konstantinos Papageorgiou; 20 March 1947 – 21 March 2014) was a Greek essayist, columnist and translator of philosophical studies.

Biography
A teacher's son, Papagiorgis was born on 20 March 1947 in Neochori, Ypati and lived in Kymi (1951–1960), Chalandri, Thessaloníki (1966–1967) and Paris (1969–1975).

He attended law school in Thessaloníki and philosophy in Paris, without, however, having completed his studies.  He began writing and translating in the latter half of the 1970s, while at the same time working in publishing. He published the theoretical magazine "Chora". He began writing essays in 1987.

In 2002 he was honored with the Greek National Literary Award (Greece's most prestigious literary award) for his work "Kanellos Delegiannis".

Papagiorgis spent the last years of his life in Athens with his wife Rania Stathopoulou and wrote for the Greek free press magazine LIFO.

References

1947 births
2014 deaths
Greek columnists
Greek translators
Greek essayists
20th-century translators
People from Ypati
20th-century essayists